René Martens (Hasselt, 27 May 1955) is a former Belgian professional road bicycle racer.

Major results

1976
Triptyque Ardennaise
Tour de Liège
Internatie Reningelst
1977
Flèche Ardennaise
Circuit du Hainaut
1981
Tour de France:
Winner stage 9
1982
Flèche Hesbignonne Cras Avernas
Tour of Flanders
Dilsen
1983
Schaal Sels-Merksem
Dilsen
1985
Bordeaux–Paris
1987
Flèche Hesbignonne Cras Avernas

External links 

Official Tour de France results for René Martens

1955 births
Living people
Belgian male cyclists
Belgian Tour de France stage winners
Sportspeople from Hasselt
Cyclists from Limburg (Belgium)
20th-century Belgian people